Säter is a locality and the seat of Säter Municipality, Dalarna County, Sweden, with 11,161 inhabitants in 2020.

Säter is, despite its small population, for historical reasons normally still referred to as a city. Statistics Sweden, however, only counts localities with more than 10,000 inhabitants as cities.

History 
At the location there was a royal mansion titled Säter's Royal Mansion.

Sweden's first copper mint was built at the location in 1624, influenced by its proximity to the copper mountain at Falun with its  tannery that had been located in Säter a few years earlier.

The town Säter was founded in 1630, and much of its old town today has preserved wooden houses and street structure from that time, which few Swedish cities have. One of the oldest houses is the city hall.

On 8 May 1642, the town was chartered by Queen Christina of Sweden, making it one of the Cities in Sweden. The chosen coat of arms depicted a miner.

Today 
The Säter hospital was opened in 1912 and was at the time Sweden's largest mental hospital which is usually associated with Säter in particular.

Sports
The following sports clubs are located in Säter:

 Säters IF FK
The ITU Long Distance Triathlon World Championships has been held in Säter twice.

Travel
Säter has a railway station along the Dala Railway with trains to Mora, Falun, Arlanda Airport and Stockholm. Suitable airports for travelling to or from Säter are Borlänge Airport (20 km distance) and Arlanda Airport (177 km).

International relations

Twin towns — Sister cities
Säter is twinned with:
Joutseno, Finland and
Laterza, Italy

References 

Municipal seats of Dalarna County
Swedish municipal seats
Populated places in Dalarna County
Populated places in Säter Municipality